Lake Sysmä is a medium-sized lake in the Vuoksi main catchment area. It is located in the region Southern Savonia and the municipality of Joroinen. 

There is about 260 islands in the lake, most notable are Uitonsaari, Kaupinsaari, Laasonsaari, Käpysaari and Lamposaari.

Sysmä is also a Finnish municipality which is situated in Päijänne Tavastia and a lake in Ilomantsi.

See also
List of lakes in Finland

References

Lakes of Joroinen